The  Bregaglia Range (commonly the Bregaglia) is a small group of mostly granite mountains in  Graubünden, Switzerland and the Province of Sondrio, northern Italy. It derives its name from the partly Swiss, partly Italian valley, the Val Bregaglia, and is known as Bergell in German. Other names which are applied to the range include the Val Masino Alps and, to describe the main ridge, Masino-Bregaglia-Disgrazia. Vicosoprano (1,067 m) is the main settlement in the Swiss part of the range.

The range is a popular mountaineering destination, and includes such peaks as Monte Disgrazia, Piz Cengalo and Piz Badile. Well-known mountaineers who are associated with the area and have made significant first ascents in the range include Leslie Stephen, D. W. Freshfield, W. A. B. Coolidge, Christian Klucker, Paul Güssfeldt and Riccardo Cassin.

A cable-car service runs from Pranzaira to the Albigna lake, and the Albigna hut (2,331 m) is a further 30–45-minute walk up the east side of the barrage.

Significant peaks

Glaciers
Main glaciers :

Forno Glacier
Albigna Glacier

Photo gallery

See also

Swiss Alps

References 
Collomb, Robin G., Bregaglia East, Goring: West Col Productions, 1971
Collomb, Robin G., Bregaglia West, Goring: West Col Productions, 1984

External links
The Bregaglia on SummitPost
Bregaglia Tourist Promotion Board
Itinerary of the Via Bregaglia
Panorama of the Bregaglia

Rhaetian Alps
Mountain ranges of the Alps
Mountain ranges of Graubünden
Mountain ranges of Italy
Val Bregaglia